The Old Gaol Building is a historic building built in 1824 in Makhanda, also known as Grahamstown, Eastern Cape, South Africa, and is the second-oldest building in Grahamstown. After the prison was closed in 1975, the building was renovated in 1984 and served as a backpackers' hostel.

References

Defunct prisons in South Africa
Buildings and structures in Makhanda, Eastern Cape
Government buildings completed in 1824
19th-century architecture in South Africa